Ratbek hadji Nysanbayev (Rátbek qajy Nysanbaıuly) was the first Supreme Mufti of Kazakhstan, controversially appointed by President Nursultan Nazarbayev. He served as mufti from January 12, 1990, to June 24, 2000.

References

External links
 Kazakhstan: Islam and the State Geographic.org
  Ратбек-кажи Нысанбай-улы: Испобедь Экс-Муфтия Созю мусульман Казахстана (Union of Kazakhstan Muslims)
  Ратбек Нысанбай-yлы Continent.kz

Islam in Kazakhstan
Kazakhstani imams
Kazakhstani Sunni Muslims
20th-century imams
Living people
Supreme Muftis of Kazakhstan
1940 births